Bridget Mary Rice (7 May 1885 – 9 December 1967) was an Irish Fianna Fáil politician. 

She was born on 7 May 1885 in Louisburgh, County Mayo to Walter Heneghan and Bridget McGreal. Her brother John Heneghan was a Columban priest. A postmistress, she married Eamon Rice on 1 September 1914, and they had four children.

Her husband Eamon Rice was a Fianna Fáil Teachta Dála (TD) for the Monaghan constituency from 1932 until his death in 1937. No by-election was held to fill his seat, but Bridget Rice was elected to Dáil Éireann as a Fianna Fáil TD at the 1938 general election for the same constituency. She was re-elected at each successive election until she retired from politics at the 1954 general election.

See also
Families in the Oireachtas

References

External links
Bridget Rice biography – Centre for Advancement of Women in Politics 

1885 births
1967 deaths
Fianna Fáil TDs
Members of the 10th Dáil
Members of the 11th Dáil
Members of the 12th Dáil
Members of the 13th Dáil
Members of the 14th Dáil
20th-century women Teachtaí Dála
Politicians from County Monaghan
Spouses of Irish politicians